Williamburg Mountain is a high "S" bend in the  ridge of Tussey Mountain, in the Ridge-and-Valley Province of the Appalachian Mountains in central Pennsylvania.

The name "Williamsburg Mountain" is a local reference, after the town of Williamsburg, and does not appear on federal maps. The mountain is also referred to as "The Loop" because of its unique shape when viewed from the air. (This is not to be confused with Loop Mountain  to the southwest, near Hollidaysburg.)

The summit of the mountain has an old lookout tower, which is now closed, and an array of communication towers. Pennsylvania Route 866 crosses the ridge less than a mile west of the summit, and it is possible to walk the access road to the summit towers. Pennsylvania State Game Lands 118 occupies the summit area of the mountain along with other parcels along the Tussey Mountain ridge.

Mountains of Pennsylvania
Landforms of Huntingdon County, Pennsylvania
Landforms of Blair County, Pennsylvania